Transcontinental Inc., operating as TC Transcontinental, is a Montreal-based packaging, commercial printing and specialty media company.

The company was established in 1976 as a direct marketing company, and later expanded into newspaper printing, and eventually publishing of newspapers and magazines. In the mid-2010's, Transcontinental began to exit the mass media industry by divesting its consumer-oriented publications, local newspapers, and most of its business-to-business publications, and expanding into the flexible packaging industry.

Transcontinental is publicly-traded on the Toronto Stock Exchange, and has over 8,000 employees—the majority of which are based in Canada, the United States and Latin America.

History 
The company was founded in 1976 by Rémi Marcoux and partners Claude Dubois and André Kingsley as a flyer-printing business. It generated $2.9 million in revenue in its first year of operations. In 1978, the company was renamed GTC Transcontinental Group, and it established a Door-to-door distribution division known as Publi-Home Distributors.

In 1979, the company entered the publishing industry after acquiring Les Journal des Affaires and SIC. It also purchased the Imprimerie Chartier printing plant. In 1984, the company went public on the Montreal Exchange, and later the Toronto Stock Exchange. Transcontinental subsequently performed a number of acquisitions over the decade that followed, including 20 Telemedia-owned community newspapers in the Montreal area, The Hockey News, and a number of commercial printing companies (including Southam Inc.'s plants and printing division), among others. In November 1999 Transcontinental acquired Canada's Information Technology publishing house Plesman Communications Inc., publishers of Computing Canada, CDN Computer Dealer News and Direction Informatique, among others. On January 29, 2000, GTC Transcontinental announced its acquisition of the publishing business of Telemedia for $150 million, including Canadian Living, Homemakers, and the Canadian editions of Elle and TV Guide. In 2002, Transcontinental acquired 12 newspapers and two printing plants in Atlantic Canada and Saskatchewan from CanWest Global for $255 million, in what was one of the company's largest transactions to date. In 2003, after receiving the contract to print La Presse, the company established its new Transcontinental Métropolitain printing plant.

In 2011, Transcontinental reached an agreement to exchange assets with the U.S. printer Quad/Graphics, acquiring six of its Canadian plants (dating back to its predecessor Quebecor World) and a prepress in Markham, Ontario, in exchange for Transcontinental's Mexican operations, and a stake in a black-and-white book printing operation owned by the company. In 2012, Rémi Marcoux stepped down as chair of the board, and was succeeded by his daughter Isabelle Marcoux.

In December 2013, Quebecor Media subsidiary Sun Media announced that it would sell 74 of its community newspapers in Quebec to Transcontinental in a deal valued at $75 million. The Competition Bureau approved the sale in May 2014, under the condition that Transcontinental divest 34 of its Quebec newspapers for competition reasons. To comply with the conditions, Transcontinental sold 14 newspapers to other parties (however, only 3 of them were slated to remain as print operations, as the remainder were to become online-only publications under their new owners), and shut down 20 of them entirely.

In March 2014, Transcontinental acquired U.S.-based Capri Packaging to expand into the flexible packaging market. The company described it as a "new promising growth area", amidst softening revenue in advertising, and decreases in its core printing businesses. In November 2014, Transcontinental sold 15 of its consumer magazines, including Canadian Living and The Hockey News, to Quebecor's Groupe TVA for $55.5 million. Transcontinental also received a contract to print magazines and marketing materials for TVA through 2021. The company stated that it wanted to focus more on its local properties.

In May 2016, Transcontinental sold its 13 newspapers in Saskatchewan to Star News Publishing of Alberta. As a result, a Transcontinental plant in Saskatoon was also shut down. On December 1, 2016, Transcontinental Media acquired Rogers Media's financial industry publications, including Advisor's Edge, Avantages, Benefits Canada, Canadian Insurance Top Broker, Conseiller, Canadian Investment Review and the Canadian Institutional Investment Network. Rogers intended to focus more on its consumer publications.

On April 13, 2017, Transcontinental announced that it had sold all of its properties and four printing plants in Atlantic Canada to SaltWire Network, a newly formed parent company of The Chronicle Herald. On April 18, 2017, Transcontinental announced that it planned to place 93 of its remaining newspapers in Ontario and Quebec (including Montreal's Métro) for sale, in order to "contribute to the continued sustainability of local media and to foster greater connections with the advertisers and communities they serve", and to focus more on its educational publishing and specialty media operations.

In April 2018, Transcontinental announced that it would acquire Coveris Americas for US$1.3 billion, its largest acquisition to-date, as part of an effort to bolster its flexible packaging business. Isabelle described the proposed purchase as one that would "[crystalize] our strategic shift toward flexible packaging and solidifies our commitment to profitable growth". The purchase would make Transcontinental the seventh-largest packaging company in North America.

On September 19, 2019, Transcontinental divested its financial industry publications between Contex Media (a new company established by Pierre Marcoux) and Newcom Media.

On September 24, 2021, Francois Olivier announced that he would retire and step down as CEO on December 10, after 13 years in the position and 28 years with the company overall. Board member Peter Brues was named the new CEO of Transcontinental.

Current operations

Packaging 
Transcontinental established its packaging business in 2014 with the purchase of Capri Packaging, as part of a move to diversify beyond its declining print and advertising businesses. The division focuses primarily on the production of flexible packaging for consumer goods, such as bags and pouches. The division has grown primarily via the acquisitions of other vendors, having consolidated into one of the largest converters of flexible packaging in North America.

Acquisitions

Printing

Acquisitions 

Transcontinental Printing is the largest commercial printing company in Canada, and one of the largest in North America.

In January 2016, the Toronto Star announced it would outsource its newspaper printing to Transcontinental with a five-year contract beginning in July 2016. The operations were shifted to its Vaughan plant, which led to the closure of the Toronto Star Press Centre. The same month, TC announced the closure of its Quebec City printing plant, resulting in the loss of 140 jobs.

This was followed in November 2017 by the announced closure of its Métropolitain plant, primarily due to the La Presse newspaper ceasing print and moving to a digital-only model. In May 2019, Transcontinental announced that it would close its Brampton plant by the end of 2019, resulting in the loss of 125 jobs.

Media

Acquisitions 

Transcontinental Media primarily published specialty business-to-business publications, particularly within the construction and financial industries (such as Les Affaires, and the former B2B publications of Rogers Media). It also publishes French-language educational resources under the Éditions Transcontinental, Éditions Caractère, and Groupe Modulo imprints.

On September 19, 2019, the company announced that it would sell its financial industry publications to two companies. Several, including Les Affaires and Benefits Canada, were divested to Contex Media—a new company led by Transcontinental president Pierre Marcoux. The former Rogers B2B publications were sold to the Toronto-based Newcom Media, leaving only Transcontinental's construction industry unit Groupe Constructo, and its book publishing unit.

Management
 Isabelle Marcoux: Chair of the board, TC Transcontinental
 Peter Brues: President and chief executive officer, TC Transcontinental
 Patrick Brayley: Senior Vice President, Premedia, Distribution and In-Store Marketing, TC Transcontinental Printing
 Nick Cannon: Senior Vice President, Ontario and Western Canada, TC Transcontinental Printing
 Magali Depras: Chief Strategy and CSR Officer, TC Transcontinental
 Christine Desaulniers, chief legal officer and corporate secretary, TC Transcontinental 
 Pierre Deslongchamps, Senior Vice President, Québec and Atlantic, TC Transcontinental Printing
 Benoit Guilbault: Chief Information Officer, TC Transcontinental
 Donald LeCavalier: Chief Financial Officer, TC Transcontinental
 Thomas Morin: President, TC Transcontinental Packaging
 Eric Morisset: Chief Corporate Development Officer, TC Transcontinental
 Lynda Newcomb, Chief Human Resources Officer, TC Transcontinental
 François Taschereau: Vice President, Corporate Communications and Public Affairs, TC Transcontinental

References

External links
 

Canadian companies established in 1976
Companies listed on the Toronto Stock Exchange
Newspaper companies of Canada
Magazine publishing companies of Canada
Companies based in Montreal
Publishing companies established in 1976
1976 establishments in Quebec